Yanda Li from the Tsinghua University, Beijing, China was named Fellow of the Institute of Electrical and Electronics Engineers (IEEE) in 2013 for contributions to research and education in signal processing and bioinformatics.

References

Fellow Members of the IEEE
Living people
Academic staff of Tsinghua University
Chinese engineers
Year of birth missing (living people)
Place of birth missing (living people)